The 1999–2000 LEB season was the 4th season of the Liga Española de Baloncesto, second tier of the Spanish basketball.

LEB standings 

There are no relegations to lower divisions.

LEB Oro Playoffs
The two winners of the semifinals are promoted to Liga ACB.

References
All scores on FEB.es

See also 
Liga Española de Baloncesto

LEB Oro seasons
1999–2000 in Spanish basketball leagues
Second level Spanish basketball league seasons